Aaron Idol (born July 4, 1980) is a Canadian professional wrestler who is best known for his work in Extreme Canadian Championship Wrestling, where he rose to become the ECCW Heavyweight Champion.

Career

Training
Idol trained at the ECCW training facility House of Pain by current ECCW roster mate and star Chance Beckett.  He then made his debut on March 18, 2001, against Gorilla Magilla.

2005 Pacific Cup
Idol competed in the 2005 Pacific Cup. He defeated Memphis Raines in the first round of the tournament.  He went on to defeat J. J. Perez in the semi-finals. Idol emerged victorious in the finals on day two of the 2005 Pacific Cup, which was held on April 23, 2005. He defeated Puma and "The American Dragon" Bryan Danielson in a triple threat match that lasted 30 minutes.  After the match, Danielson proceeded to smash the Pacific Cup and claimed that ECCW was inferior to New Japan Pro-Wrestling.  Puma and Danielson proceeded to beat down Idol. ECCW promoter Dave Republic then issued a challenge and gave Antonio Inoki 30 days to respond. Inoki did not respond and the challenge was dropped as a result.

NWA Pacific Northwest Junior Heavyweight Championship
Winning the 2005 Pacific Cup took his career to next level.  On June 24, 2005, Idol challenged for the NWA Pacific Northwest Junior Heavyweight Championship.  He defeated Memphis Raines and former trainer Chance Beckett in a Triple Threat Match to become the new champion.

NWA Canadian Junior Heavyweight Championship
He challenged Scotty Mac for the NWA Canadian Junior Heavyweight Championship on October 21, 2005.  He defeated then champion Scotty Mac in Port Coquitlam, British Columbia.  On March 11, 2006 Idol vacated the title to concentrate on the ECCW Heavyweight Championship.

ECCW Heavyweight Championship
Idol challenged for the ECCW Heavyweight Champion on many occasions, but was unsuccessful.  He then got the win he was looking for; he defeated Randy Tyler in a Steel Cage Match on June 22, 2007 in Surrey, British Columbia. Idol forfeited the ECCW Heavyweight Championship to Scotty Mac on December 28, 2007, due to a shoulder injury.

Championships and accomplishments
Extreme Canadian Championship Wrestling
ECCW Heavyweight Championship (1 time)
ECCW Pacific Cup (2005)
NWA Canadian Junior Heavyweight Championship (1 time)
NWA Pacific Northwest Junior Heavyweight Championship (1 time)
Portland Wrestling
PW Tag Team Championship (1 time) - with Scotty Mac
Pro Wrestling Illustrated
PWI ranked him #356 of the 500 best singles wrestlers of the year in the PWI 500 in 2005
Top Ranked Wrestling
TRW Cruiserweight Championship (1 time)

References

External links
Aaron Idol on Online World of Wrestling
Aaron Idol on Myspace

1980 births
Canadian male professional wrestlers
Living people
Professional wrestlers from British Columbia
Sportspeople from Burnaby